This article collects together a variety of proofs of Fermat's little theorem, which states that

for every prime number p and every integer a (see modular arithmetic).

Simplifications
Some of the proofs of Fermat's little theorem given below depend on two simplifications.

The first is that we may assume that  is in the range . This is a simple consequence of the laws of modular arithmetic; we are simply saying that we may first reduce  modulo . This is consistent with reducing  modulo , as one can check.

Secondly, it suffices to prove that

Indeed, if the previous assertion holds for such , multiplying both sides by  yields the original form of the theorem,

Combinatorial proofs

Proof by counting necklaces
This is perhaps the simplest known proof, requiring the least mathematical background. It is an attractive example of a combinatorial proof (a proof that involves counting a collection of objects in two different ways).

The proof given here is an adaptation of Golomb's proof.

To keep things simple, let us assume that  is a positive integer. Consider all the possible strings of  symbols, using an alphabet with  different symbols.

We will argue below that if we remove the strings consisting of a single symbol from the list (in our example,  and ), the remaining  strings can be arranged into groups, each group containing exactly  strings. It follows that  is divisible by .

Necklaces

Let us think of each such string as representing a necklace. That is, we connect the two ends of the string together and regard two strings as the same necklace if we can rotate one string to obtain the second string; in this case we will say that the two strings are friends. In our example, the following strings are all friends:
In full, each line of the following list corresponds to a single necklace, and the entire list comprises all 32 strings.
 ,
 .
Notice that in the above list, each necklace with more than one symbol is represented by 5 different strings, and the number of necklaces represented by just one string is 2, i.e. is the number of distinct symbols.

One can use the following rule to work out how many friends a given string  has:

For example, suppose we start with the string , which is built up of several copies of the shorter string . If we rotate it one symbol at a time, we obtain the following 3 strings:
 ,
 ,
 .
There aren't any others, because  is exactly 3 symbols long and cannot be broken down into further repeating strings.

Completing the proof
Using the above rule, we can complete the proof of Fermat's little theorem quite easily, as follows. Our starting pool of  strings may be split into two categories:
 Some strings contain  identical symbols. There are exactly  of these, one for each symbol in the alphabet.
 The rest of the strings use at least two distinct symbols from the alphabet. Therefore, the above rule tells us that  has exactly  friends (including  itself).

The second category contains  strings, and they may be arranged into groups of  strings, one group for each necklace.

Proof using dynamical systems
This proof uses some basic concepts from dynamical systems.

We start by considering a family of functions Tn(x), where n ≥ 2 is an integer, mapping the interval [0, 1] to itself by the formula

where {y} denotes the fractional part of y. For example, the function T3(x) is illustrated below:

A number x0 is said to be a fixed point of a function f(x) if f(x0) = x0; in other words, if f leaves x0 fixed. The fixed points of a function can be easily found graphically: they are simply the x coordinates of the points where the graph of f(x) intersects the graph of the line y = x. For example, the fixed points of the function T3(x) are 0, 1/2, and 1; they are marked by black circles on the following diagram:

We will require the following two lemmas.

Lemma 1. For any n ≥ 2, the function Tn(x) has exactly n fixed points.

Proof. There are 3 fixed points in the illustration above, and the same sort of geometrical argument applies for any n ≥ 2.

Lemma 2. For any positive integers n and m, and any 0 ≤ x ≤ 1,

In other words, Tmn(x) is the composition of Tn(x) and Tm(x).

Proof. The proof of this lemma is not difficult, but we need to be slightly careful with the endpoint x = 1. For this point the lemma is clearly true, since

So let us assume that 0 ≤ x < 1. In this case,

so Tm(Tn(x)) is given by

Therefore, what we really need to show is that

To do this we observe that {nx} = nx − k, where k is the integer part of nx; then

since mk is an integer.

Now let us properly begin the proof of Fermat's little theorem, by studying the function Tap(x). We will assume that a ≥ 2. From Lemma 1, we know that it has ap fixed points. By Lemma 2 we know that

so any fixed point of Ta(x) is automatically a fixed point of Tap(x).

We are interested in the fixed points of Tap(x) that are not fixed points of Ta(x). Let us call the set of such points S. There are ap − a points in S, because by Lemma 1 again, Ta(x) has exactly a fixed points. The following diagram illustrates the situation for a = 3 and p = 2. The black circles are the points of S, of which there are 32 − 3 = 6.

The main idea of the proof is now to split the set S up into its orbits under Ta. What this means is that we pick a point x0 in S, and repeatedly apply Ta(x) to it, to obtain the sequence of points

This sequence is called the orbit of x0 under Ta. By Lemma 2, this sequence can be rewritten as

Since we are assuming that x0 is a fixed point of Ta p(x), after p steps we hit Tap(x0) = x0, and from that point onwards the sequence repeats itself.

However, the sequence cannot begin repeating itself any earlier than that. If it did, the length of the repeating section would have to be a divisor of p, so it would have to be 1 (since p is prime). But this contradicts our assumption that x0 is not a fixed point of Ta.

In other words, the orbit contains exactly p distinct points. This holds for every orbit of S. Therefore, the set S, which contains ap − a points, can be broken up into orbits, each containing p points, so ap − a is divisible by p.

(This proof is essentially the same as the necklace-counting proof given above, simply viewed through a different lens: one may think of the interval [0, 1] as given by sequences of digits in base a (our distinction between 0 and 1 corresponding to the familiar distinction between representing integers as ending in ".0000..." and ".9999..."). Tan amounts to shifting such a sequence by n many digits. The fixed points of this will be sequences that are cyclic with period dividing n. In particular, the fixed points of Tap can be thought of as the necklaces of length p, with Tan corresponding to rotation of such necklaces by n spots.

This proof could also be presented without distinguishing between 0 and 1, simply using the half-open interval [0, 1); then Tn would only have n − 1 fixed points, but Tap − Ta would still work out to ap − a, as needed.)

Multinomial proofs

Proofs using the binomial theorem

Proof 1

This proof, due to Euler, uses induction to prove the theorem for all integers .

The base step, that , is trivial. For this inductive step, we need the following lemma.

Lemma.

The lemma is a case of the freshman's dream. Leaving the proof for later on, we proceed with the induction.

Proof. Assume kp ≡ k (mod p), and consider (k+1)p. By the lemma we have

Using the induction hypothesis, we have that kp ≡ k (mod p); and, trivially, 1p = 1. Thus

which is the statement of the theorem for a = k+1. ∎

In order to prove the lemma, we must introduce the binomial theorem, which states that for any positive integer n,

where the coefficients are the binomial coefficients,

described in terms of the factorial function, n! = 1×2×3×⋯×n.

Proof of Lemma. We consider the binomial coefficient when the exponent is a prime p:

The binomial coefficients are all integers.  The numerator contains a factor p by the definition of factorial.  When 0 < i < p, neither of the terms in the denominator includes a factor of p (relying on the primality of p), leaving the coefficient itself to possess a prime factor of p from the numerator, implying that

Modulo p, this eliminates all but the first and last terms of the sum on the right-hand side of the binomial theorem for prime p. ∎

The primality of p is essential to the lemma; otherwise, we have examples like

which is not divisible by 4.

Proof 2

Using the Lemma, we have:

.

Proof using the multinomial expansion
The proof, which was first discovered by Leibniz (who did not publish it) and later rediscovered by Euler, is a very simple application of the multinomial theorem, which states

where

Thus if we express  as a sum of 1s (ones), we obtain

(This proof is essentially a coarser-grained variant of the necklace-counting proof given earlier; the multinomial coefficients count the number of ways a string can be permuted into arbitrary anagrams, while the necklace argument counts the number of ways a string can be rotated into cyclic anagrams. That is to say, that the nontrivial multinomial coefficients here are divisible by  can be seen as a consequence of the fact that each nontrivial necklace of length  can be unwrapped into a string in  many ways.

This multinomial expansion is also, of course, what essentially underlies the binomial theorem-based proof above)

Proof using power product expansions

An additive-combinatorial proof based on formal power product expansions was given by Giedrius Alkauskas. This proof uses neither the Euclidean algorithm nor the binomial theorem, but rather it employs formal power series with rational coefficients.

Proof as a particular case of Euler's theorem
This proof, discovered by James Ivory and rediscovered by Dirichlet requires some background in modular arithmetic.

The idea is that if we write down the sequence of numbers

and reduce each one modulo , the resulting sequence turns out to be a rearrangement of

Therefore, if we multiply together the numbers in each sequence, the results must be identical modulo :

Collecting together the  terms yields

Finally, we may “cancel out” the numbers  from both sides of this equation, obtaining

There are two steps in the above proof that we need to justify:
 Why it is valid to “cancel” in the setting of modular arithmetic.
We will prove these things below; let us first see an example of this proof in action.

An example

reducing modulo 7 gives

which is just a rearrangement of

Multiplying them together gives

that is,

Canceling out 1 × 2 × 3 × 4 × 5 × 6 yields

which is Fermat's little theorem for the case  and .

The cancellation law

Let us first explain why it is valid, in certain situations, to “cancel”. The exact statement is as follows.

then we may “cancel”  to obtain

Indeed, the assertion simply means that  divides . Since  is a prime which does not divide , Euclid's lemma tells us that it must divide  instead; that is, holds.

Note that the conditions under which the cancellation law holds are quite strict, and this explains why Fermat's little theorem demands that  is a prime. For example, but it is not true that .

then we may “cancel”  to obtain

This follows from a generalization of Euclid's lemma.

The rearrangement property

Finally, we must explain why the sequence

when reduced modulo p, becomes a rearrangement of the sequence

Since there are exactly  of these, the only possibility is that the former are a rearrangement of the latter.

Applications to Euler's theorem

Both the rearrangement property and the cancellation law (under the generalized form mentioned above) are still satisfied and can be utilized.

Thus we have:

Therefore,

Proof as a corollary of Euler's criterion

Proofs using group theory

Standard proof
This proof requires the most basic elements of group theory.

The idea is to recognise that the set }, with the operation of multiplication (taken modulo ), forms a group. So  for some positive integer  and then

Thus Bézout's identity assures us that there are integers  and  such that . So, as remarked earlier,  is a group.

For example, when , the inverses of each element are given as follows:
{| border="1" cellspacing="0" cellpadding="8"
| align="center" | 
| 1 || 2 || 3 || 4 || 5 || 6 || 7 || 8 || 9 || 10
|-
| align="center" | 
| 1 || 6 || 4 || 3 || 9 || 2 || 8 || 7 || 5 || 10
|}

Euler's proof
If we take the previous proof and, instead of using Lagrange's theorem, we try to prove it in this specific situation, then we get Euler's third proof, which is the one that he found more natural. Let  be the set whose elements are the numbers  reduced modulo . If , then  and therefore  divides .

Let  be the set whose elements are the numbers  reduced modulo . Then  has  distinct elements, because otherwise there would be two distinct numbers } such that , which is impossible, since it would follow that .

So, the set  has  elements. If it turns out to be equal to G, then  and therefore  divides . Since  is finite, this process must stop at some point and this proves that  divides .

 ,
 ,
 ,
we have  and }. Clearly, }. Then, since
 ,
 ,
 ,
 ,
we have }. Clearly, . Then, since
 ,
 ,
 ,
 ,
we have }. And now .

Notes

Modular arithmetic
Number theory
Article proofs